The 1957–58 season was the 74th football season in which Dumbarton competed at a Scottish national level, entering the Scottish Football League, the Scottish Cup and the Scottish League Cup.  In addition Dumbarton played in the Stirlingshire Cup.

Scottish Second Division

Dumbarton were to challenge for promotion from Division 2 for most of the season, but a disastrous run in the final five games, where only three points were taken, was to prove to be conclusive and in the end a fourth-place finish was achieved with 44 points, 11 behind champions Stirling Albion.

Scottish League Cup

Only two wins were achieved in the 6 sectional games of the League Cup, but one of these was a 10–3 thumping of Stranraer.

Scottish Cup

Dumbarton received a tough first round draw in the Cup and lost out to eventual champions Clyde.

Stirlingshire Cup
Alloa were to prove too strong for Dumbarton in the semi final of the county cup.

Dewar Shield
As the previous season's Stirlingshire champions, Dumbarton were drawn to meet the Aberdeenshire Cup holders, Buckie Thistle.  As was the case four years earlier, Dumbarton withdrew.

Friendlies

Player statistics

|}

Source:

Transfers
Amongst those players joining and leaving the club were the following:

Players in

Players out 

Source:

References

Dumbarton F.C. seasons
Scottish football clubs 1957–58 season